Tachina vernalis is a species of fly in the genus Tachina of the family Tachinidae that is endemic to Europe, but was introduced to New England.

References

Insects described in 1830
Diptera of Europe
vernalis